Katherine Bear Tur (born October 26, 1983) is an American author and broadcast journalist working as a correspondent for NBC News. Tur is an anchor for MSNBC Reports, where since 2021 she has hosted Katy Tur Reports on MSNBC.Katy Tur Reports on MSNBC She has also reported for the NBC news platforms Early Today, Today, NBC Nightly News, Meet the Press, WNBC-TV, MSNBC, and The Weather Channel.

Early life
Tur is the daughter of journalists Zoey Tur and Marika Gerrard. She graduated from Brentwood School (2001), and from the University of California, Santa Barbara (2005) with a Bachelor of Arts in philosophy. She is of Jewish descent.

Career
Tur reported for KTLA, HD News/Cablevision, News 12 Brooklyn, WPIX-TV, and Fox 5 New York. Later on, Tur worked as a storm chaser for The Weather Channel on the network's VORTEX2 team.

NBC News
In 2009, Tur joined NBC's local station in New York City, WNBC-TV, and then rose to the flagship NBC News at the national network level. That year she was awarded AP’s Best Spot News Award for coverage of the March 2008 crane collapse on the Upper East Side of Manhattan. While at NBC News, she covered the death of Cory Monteith, a motorcycle attack on an SUV, and the search for Malaysia Airlines Flight 370.

Trump campaign correspondent
Tur was NBC News's and MSNBC's embedded reporter on the 2016 Donald Trump presidential campaign. As a reporter for NBC, Tur was assigned the task of informing the Trump campaign about the Access Hollywood tape that the network had in its possession, featuring Trump's remarks about women in a conversation with Billy Bush.

On several occasions during his campaign rallies, Trump singled out Tur in his criticism of the press. At an event in Florida, Tur was booed by Trump supporters and, according to CNN anchor Wolf Blitzer, verbally harassed. According to Trump campaign manager Kellyanne Conway, "[Trump] didn't mean it in any malicious way", and he did not want anyone to attack or harass her.

In 2017, Tur received the Walter Cronkite Award for Excellence in Journalism.

Tur reflected on covering the Trump campaign and his treatment of her at campaign rallies in an article for Marie Claire. In September 2017, she published a book, Unbelievable: My Front-Row Seat to the Craziest Campaign in American History, recounting her experience in covering Trump's 2016 presidential campaign. The book spent several weeks on the New York Times Best Seller list.

Personal life
From 2006 to 2009, Tur was in a relationship with then-MSNBC political commentator and sportscaster Keith Olbermann. Tur married Tony Dokoupil, a correspondent for CBS News, on October 27, 2017, in Utah.  Together they have a son, born in April 2019, and a daughter, born in May 2021. She also has two stepchildren from Dokoupil's first marriage.

She is fluent in Spanish.

Tur had a falling out with one of her parents, Zoey Tur, and the two did not speak for several years. In her 2022 book Rough Draft: A Memoir, Tur details her parents' achievements, as well as her relationship with them while being raised as the daughter of "parents as broadcast pioneers who often put themselves in harm's way".

Bibliography
 Unbelievable: My Front Row Seat to the Craziest Campaign in American History (Dey Street, 2017)
 Rough Draft: A Memoir (Atria/One Signal Publishers, 2022)

See also
 New Yorkers in journalism

References

External links 

 
 

1983 births
Living people
American television reporters and correspondents
American women television journalists
American people of Jewish descent
People from Los Angeles
MSNBC people
NBC News people
The Weather Channel people
Storm chasers
University of California, Santa Barbara alumni